Anthony Brosse (born 4 November 1980) is a French politician of LREM who has been a Member of the National Assembly for Loiret's 5th constituency since 2022.

References

See also 

 List of deputies of the 16th National Assembly of France

1980 births
Living people
Deputies of the 16th National Assembly of the French Fifth Republic
La République En Marche! politicians
21st-century French politicians
Members of Parliament for Loiret